The Chinese Federation of Labor (CFL) is a national trade union center in the Republic of China. It was founded in 1948 in mainland China, and until the government recognition of the Taiwan Confederation of Trade Unions in 2000, was the sole official labor confederation in the RoC.

The CFL is closely linked with the Kuomintang (KMT), and has experienced some difficulties with the government since the KMT lost power during democratization.

The CFL is affiliated with the International Trade Union Confederation.

See also

 Labor Union of National Taiwan University
 All-China Federation of Trade Unions

References

Trade unions in Taiwan
International Trade Union Confederation
Trade unions established in 1948
Taiwan